Her Husband's Secretary is a 1937 American drama film directed by Frank McDonald and written by Lillie Hayward. The film stars Jean Muir, Beverly Roberts, Warren Hull, Joseph Crehan, Clara Blandick and Addison Richards. The film was released by Warner Bros. on February 26, 1937.

Plot

Cast        
Jean Muir as Carol Blane Kingdon
Beverly Roberts as Diane Ware
Warren Hull as Barton 'Bart' Kingdon
Joseph Crehan as Stevenson
Clara Blandick as Agatha 'Aunt Gussie' Kingdon
Addison Richards as Steven Garron
Harry Davenport as Dan Kingdon
Gordon Hart as Mr. Blake
Minerva Urecal as Miss Baldwin

References

External links 
 

1937 films
1930s English-language films
Warner Bros. films
American drama films
1937 drama films
Films directed by Frank McDonald
American black-and-white films
1930s American films